The yolk sac is a membranous sac attached to an embryo, formed by cells of the hypoblast layer of the bilaminar embryonic disc. This is alternatively called the umbilical vesicle by the Terminologia Embryologica (TE), though yolk sac is far more widely used. In humans, the yolk sac is important in early embryonic blood supply, and much of it is incorporated into the primordial gut during the fourth week of embryonic development.

In humans

The yolk sac is the first element seen within the gestational sac during pregnancy, usually at 3 days gestation.

The yolk sac is situated on the front (ventral) part of the embryo; it is lined by extra-embryonic endoderm, outside of which is a layer of extra-embryonic mesenchyme, derived from the epiblast.

Blood is conveyed to the wall of the yolk sac by the primitive aorta and after circulating through a wide-meshed capillary plexus, is returned by the vitelline veins to the tubular heart of the embryo. This constitutes the vitelline circulation, which in humans serves as a location of haematopoiesis. Before the placenta is formed and can take over, the yolk sac provides nutrition and gas exchange between the mother and the developing embryo.

At the end of the fourth week, the yolk sac presents the appearance of a small pear-shaped opening (traditionally called the umbilical vesicle), into the digestive tube by a long narrow tube, the vitelline duct. Rarely, the yolk sac can be seen in the afterbirth as a small, somewhat oval-shaped body whose diameter varies from 1 mm to 5 mm; it is situated between the amnion and the chorion and may lie on or at a varying distance from the placenta. There is no clinical significance to a residual external yolk sac.

As a rule the duct undergoes complete obliteration by the 20th week as most of the yolk sac is incorporated into the developing gastrointestinal tract, but in about two percent of cases its proximal part persists as a diverticulum from the small intestine, Meckel's diverticulum, which is situated about 60 cm proximal to the ileocecal valve, and may be attached by a fibrous cord to the abdominal wall at the umbilicus.

Sometimes a narrowing of the lumen of the ileum is seen opposite the site of attachment of the duct.

Histogenesis
The yolk sac starts forming during the second week of the embryonic development, at the same time as the shaping of the amniotic sac. The hypoblast starts proliferating laterally and descending. In the meantime Heuser's membrane, located on the opposite pole of the developing vesicle, starts its upward proliferation and meets the hypoblast.

Modifications
Primary yolk sac: it is the vesicle which develops in the second week, its floor is represented by Heuser's membrane and its ceiling by the hypoblast. It is also known as the exocoelomic cavity.
Secondary yolk sac: this structure is formed when the extraembryonic mesoderm separates to form the extraembryonic coelom; cells from the mesoderm pinch off an area of the yolk sac, and what remains is the secondary yolk sac.
The final yolk sac: during the fourth week of development, during organogenesis, part of the yolk sac is surrounded by endoderm and incorporated into the embryo as the gut. The remaining part of the yolk sac is the final yolk sac.

Additional images

See also
Yolk sac tumor

References

Embryology of cardiovascular system